Cheddar sauce, cheddar cheese sauce, or cheese sauce is a traditional sauce used in English cooking. The sauce is based upon white sauce, which is known as one of the 'mother sauces', and cheddar cheese. It could be seen as an English equivalent of the French Mornay sauce (itself a variant of Béchamel sauce traditionally mixed with half Gruyère and half Parmesan). The sauce is made by adding an amount of cheddar cheese to white sauce and then spiced using English mustard, Worcestershire sauce and pepper among other ingredients.

It can be purchased both as a ready to use sauce and as a powder in British supermarkets. In the United States, a mass-produced cheddar sauce is purveyed under the Ragú brand, and is called "double cheddar sauce".

Uses
Cheddar sauce can be used in a variety of ways including being poured over meats, types of pasta, vegetables and even as a dip.  It is used in the preparation of a variety of British dishes, including the following:

Fish pie
Macaroni and cheese
Cauliflower cheese
Parmo
Lasagna

See also
 Cheese sauce
 List of cheese dishes
 List of sauces

References

English cuisine
British condiments
Cheese dishes